The 1963 Washington State Cougars football team was an American football team that represented Washington State University in the Athletic Association of Western Universities (AAWU) during the 1963 NCAA University Division football season. In their eighth and final season under head coach Jim Sutherland, the Cougars compiled a 3–6–1 record (1–1 in AAWU, fourth), and were outscored 160 to 95.

The team's statistical leaders included Dave Mathieson with 859 passing yards, Clancy Williams with 523 rushing yards, and Gerry Shaw with 409 receiving yards.

Sutherland voluntarily stepped down in December with a year remaining on his contract, and later owned several automobile dealerships in Spokane. He was succeeded at WSU in January 1964 by Bert Clark, an assistant at rival Washington under Jim Owens.

Schedule

Final game was delayed a week following the assassination of President Kennedy.

NFL Draft
Two Cougars were selected in the 1964 NFL Draft, which was twenty rounds (280 selections).

References

External links
 Game program: Arizona vs. WSU at Spokane – October 5, 1963
 Game program: San Jose State at WSU – October 12, 1963
 Game program: Idaho at WSU – November 2, 1963
 Game program: Oregon at WSU – November 9, 1963

Washington State
Washington State Cougars football seasons
Washington State Cougars football